The Communist Party of Quebec (PCQ-PCC) is a communist provincial political party in Quebec. It is affiliated with, but officially independent from, the Communist Party of Canada.

In 2005, a sovereigntist faction, led by André Parizeau, left the PCQ-PCC and formed the Parti communiste du Québec (PCQ) which was registered with Élections Québec from 2005 to 2012. Meanwhile, the Communist Party of Canada recognizes the group led by Adrien Welsh which maintains the original programme of the PCQ including full integration with the Communist Party of Canada.

Communists in Quebec have run as candidates in Quebec and federal general elections from 1936 to the present day. The Communist Party was made illegal and banned in 1941, and henceforth the party operated as Parti ouvrier-progressiste (in English: "Labor-Progressive Party") until 1959. In 1965, members of the Communist Party of Canada in Quebec created the Parti communiste du Québec. Sam Walsh was leader of the party from 1962 to 1990.

In 2002, the PCQ-PCC joined in a federation with the Rassemblement pour l'alternative progressiste and the Parti de la démocratie socialiste to form the Union des forces progressistes, which in turn merged with Option Citoyenne to form Québec solidaire. The PCQ-PCC left Québec solidaire in 2017, when Québec solidaire merged with Option nationale.

The PCQ-PCC publishes the newspaper Clarté.

History

Origins, 1921–1965 
Despite the strong influence of the Catholic Church on Quebec society, and the small size of the working class associated with the economic 'maldéveloppement' of Quebec's economy, the debate and discussion of radical, democratic, and progressive ideas in Quebec has a long tradition going back to before the Patriot rebellion. While the Catholic Church, particularly after the Russian Revolution in 1917, waged an active campaign from the pulpit against trade unionists, leftists and Communists, Marxist discussion already had taken hold in Quebec by the early 1920s.

In 1920, Annie Buller, an anglophone native of Montreal, returned from attending the New York Rand School, and helped found the Montreal Labour College with Becky Buhay and Bella Gauld in 1920. The Labour College was deeply connected to labour unions. In 1921, Buller became a founding member of the underground Communist Party of Canada (CPC) which united other radical labour activists from Nova Scotia to BC. The three Montreal women became leaders of the Workers Party of Canada, the legal formation of the CPC, which applied for recognition with the Comintern. The Labour College became a launch-pad for the Communists in Quebec among the working-class anglophone community.

Around the same time, in 1923 radical militant Albert Saint-Martin also proposed establishing a French-Canadian section of the Communist International in the USSR. Like many of the early founders of the CPC, Saint-Marin's background was in anarchism. While the request was rejected by the international and the Communists were instructed build a united party, the Comintern it did not ignore the special national situation that presented itself in Quebec. (The internationalist commitment of the CPC would be important in helping the party better understand Quebec's situation and eventually adopt a policy supporting the right of self-determination and sovereignty, up to and including separation.)

The Communists therefore began organizing in the area with Quebec as part of a department of the CPC, at times joined with northern Ontario. By the end of the 1920s an active group had made something of break-through in the Jewish community of Montreal and elsewhere among some French-speaking workers across Quebec, organizing needle-trade workers. There was also an active group of the Young Communist League and the Young Pioneers. A number of important leaders of the CPC, including future YCL and then party leader William Kashtan, came out of the Montreal organization. By 1927, the CPC had begun to also focus on political activity among French-Canadian workers in Quebec, recruiting and training new cadres for the Party. In 1928, Georges Dubois joined the party and became the French-Canadian organizer with other leaders like Buhay.

The late 1920s were an important period of ideological turmoil, debate and discussion and clarification of the Party programme for the CPC. Likewise, with the help of the Comintern, the CPC began to better understand the unequal and oppressed situation of the French-Canadian people in Canada and began to demand that the rights of French speakers be recognized.

In July 1930, during the Great Depression, the party stepped up its visibility by presenting E. Simard, a blacksmith, as the first Communist candidate in the federal elections running in Maisonneuve, Montreal. Simard's programme characterized the Communist platform of the time, demanding employment insurance reform, public health care, and immediate action on the unemployed. Party organizer Georges Dubois was arrested by the police during the campaign. The party organized a demonstration against the arrest at Viger Square, the police brutally disperse the hundreds of protesting workers.

Repression and resistance, 1930s–1950s 
During the Depression the CPC in Montreal was one of the few radical and active organizations on the left, despite being banned. In 1934, when leader Paul Delisle died, the party held a "red" funeral in Montreal and attracted a crowd. Mass meetings were an important activity for the party. The CPC organized an assembly of the League against War and Fascism in Montreal, when 600 people came out to hear Lilian Mendelssohn, Joe Wallace, Fred Rose, Maurice Armstrong and a young student who had just returned from France – Stanley Bréhaut Ryerson. In another documented rally, as many as  4,000 people gathered at St. Jacques Market to hear Joe Wallace, John Boychuk, Becky Buhay, Paul and Tom McEwen and were brutally dispersed by police.

Growing in stature, the party made its journal Clarté into a weekly (it was published until 1939). Leader Evariste Dube visited the USSR on a special party delegation, as did radical medic Norman Bethune with a group of progressive Canadian doctors. On his return, Bethune joined the Communist Party. Bethune became one of the most famous Canadians internationally, and the most well-known member of the CPC. His decision to join the party was shaped not just be what he saw in the Soviet Union, but also communist participation in the workplaces and communities of Montreal.

For example, the party created unemployed clubs and focused on labour organizing. S. Larkin, J. Bedard, C. A. Perry, L. Dufour and Ms. Lebrun helped build various clubs and groups of factory workers like the United Lorimier Unemployed League St. Henri. Labour demands were also front-and-centre in October 1935 when the CPC, now de-criminalized and able to operate legally, ran in the federal election: leader Fred Rose got 3378 votes in Montreal-Cartier, while CA Perry got 1,012 in Saint-Denis.

A following year the young radical Stanley Bréhaut Ryerson was elected secretary of the Communist Party in Quebec. Ryerson's leadership came at a time when the party was shifting its approach much more towards the united front. By 1936 Lucien Dufour, President of the Front Populaire, reported that 56 organizations were part in Quebec with their central theme as organizing the struggles of the unemployed.

Abandoning the 'department' model, an executive committee of the Quebec section of the Communist Party was formed including Evariste Dube (Chairman), S. B. Ryerson (secretary), Fred Rose, Emile Godin Alec Rosenberg, Samuel Emery. Alex Gauld, Mrs. Leo Lebrun, Willie Fortin, Jean Bourget Sarkin and Sydney. Some of these activists ran in the August 1936 provincial election. Fred Rose got 578 votes in St. Louis, Evariste Dube 185 votes in Saint-Jacques and Emile Godin 288 votes in Sainte-Marie.

The Communists' greater strength and organization, and the failure to ban the party on the federal level, prompted reactionary Quebec premier Maurice Duplessis to create the repressive padlock law in 1937 against the CPC and all supposedly communist groups. Duplessis quickly padlocked the offices of the CPC's newspaper, Clarté, and of Jewish community groups and other progressive organizations. The law stayed on the books until the late 1950s, when a challenge organized by the CPC at the Supreme Court level overturned the law.

In June 1937, a demonstration of 300 to 400 women in the Champ de Mars was organized by Solidarity Women. Five women were arrested after the police charge. Norman Bethune returned to Montreal after a journey of several months in Spain. Thousands of people were waiting his arrival at Bonaventure station and organized a parade in the streets of Montreal in his honour. Over 15,000 people gathered at the Mount Royal Arena to hear Bethune tell what he saw in Spain. He declared: "Spain can be the tomb of fascism". Bethune toured the country for seven months to raise money for the Spanish Republic.

In May 1938, approximately 4,000 people attended a meeting of the Communist Party unit and the Co-operative Commonwealth Federation in the Mont-Royal arena in Montreal. The main speakers were Eugene Forsey, CCF and Stanley B. Ryerson for the Communist Party.

In 1941, at a meeting in Montreal, Guy Caron of the Communist Party and Jean-Charles Harvey of Le Jour newspaper spoke to 6,000 people to support the war effort against the fascists.

On 9 August 1943, Fred Rose was elected MP for Montreal-Cartier during a federal by-election. He won 5767 votes.

In November 1943, the First Congress of the Labor-Progressive Party of Quebec was held at Montreal with 172 delegates representing 40 clubs from the party.

In the August 1944 provincial election, the Labor-Progressive Party candidate in Saint Louis, Michael Buhay, won 6,512 votes.

In the June 1945 federal election, Fred Rose was re-elected MP for Montreal-Cartier.

On 14 March 1946, Fred Rose was arrested and accused of spying for the Soviet Union in the wake of revelations of Igor Gouzenko. He was freed after six years in prison and deported to Poland, where he later died. The Canadian government never gave him the right to return.

In 1946, Guy Caron was appointed leader of the Quebec Labor-Progressive Party (LPP).

In April 1946, Henri Gagnon and other Communists for the League of Homeless Veterans: Gagnon is president. The league consisted of squatters occupying homes that veterans can not afford, or unoccupied, for their return.

In 1948, Police conducted a seizure at the local newspaper Combat (founded 1946), under the padlock law.

In 1951, Fred Rose was released after six years in prison. Because of continued harassment by the police he decided to leave Canada for Czechoslovakia and Poland.

On 14 October 1956, a public meeting was held in Montreal following the 20th Congress of the CPSU. Tim Buck and J.B. Salsberg, returned from the USSR, and reported the results of their talks with Soviet leaders. On 15 October, dissatisfied with the explanations provided by Buck, Guy Caron resigned from the LPP with five other members of the provincial committee: Ken Perry, Harry Gulkin, Norman Nerenberg, Frank Arnold and Pierre Gélinas.

In February 1957, in an article published in Clarity, Henri Gagnon estimated that 200 members had left the party since the revelations of Khrushchev.

In March 1957, the padlock law was declared unconstitutional.

From the end of the Cold War to Perestroika 
In 1965, the Communist Party of Quebec was definitely established a political party under the laws of Quebec, under the chairmanship of Samuel Walsh.

In 1973, the PCQ published a pamphlet calling for the creation of a mass federated party in Quebec and calling on unions to take the lead in this process. Quebec then saw an unprecedented rise of struggles. After the big strike of 1972 in the public sector, there was the imprisonment of union leaders and the outbreak of unprecedented general strike in Quebec.

The idea received a more favourable reception in many unions, especially in Montreal. The project to create a mass party of workers from unions was subject to closed debate on the floor of Congress of the Quebec Federation of Labour in 1975. But the proposal was defeated. Elsewhere, particularly in the Confédération des Syndicats Nationaux and the CEQ, the same enthusiasm gave way slowly to the ground a certain selflessness. The problem lay in the fact that the support of the Parti Québécois (PQ) was skyrocketing, including in unions, as people realized that the PQ could take power. In November 1976 the PQ took power for the first time.

Given the lack of enthusiasm on the part of unions to promote such a project, which was increasingly seen as being harmful to the chances of PQ to finally beat the Liberals, and to the difficulties within the groups Left can agree because of the extreme partisanship that existed then the idea died a natural death.

In 1980, the PCQ gave its support to the Yes Campaign, at the first referendum on Quebec sovereignty in 1980.

In March 1983, Fred Rose died in Poland.

In 1991, the Communist Party was liquidated, and socialism in the Soviet Union was overturned.

Reorganization and the formation of Québec solidaire 

During the crisis in CPC during the 1990s, the PCQ became disorganized, closed its offices, and its remaining members drifted apart from the CPC, adopting positions sympathetic to nationalism. The CPC maintained relations with the PCQ, however, which addressed its congresses in Toronto and Vancouver.

It was not until 1997 that a range of communists and communist groups came together to re-organize the PCQ—ranging from Greek friends of the KKE to members of the neo-Maoist Communist Workers Group (ACG). The old members of the PCQ who left the party a few years before re-joined, and although recognizing differences over the national question they decided to work together.

A few years later the party helped bring together different tendencies in the left to form the Union of Progressive Forces (UFP) which became Québec solidaire.

Although the PCQ has just departed on a new basis, it is already active in promoting the search for greater unity among the left forces. Beginning in September, members of the CPC in Quebec had in fact begun to meet some members of the Social Democratic Party of Quebec (PDS) to discuss possible cooperation.  In the elections of 1998, the Communist Party of Quebec called for an alliance with the PDS. While the offer was unanswered, the steps were nevertheless useful.

A few months later, in a rather unexpected move, the SDP calls on the DMP effect coming as a special guest, to attend their next conference, in order to enforce its vision of the unity of left forces.

In 2002, the Communist Party of Quebec formed a federation with the Party of Social Democracy (PDS) and the Rally for the progressive alternative (RAP) to form the Union of Progressive Forces (UFP). The UFP in turn merged with the political movement Option citizen in 2006 to form the party Québec solidaire (QS).

2005 split 
The UFP agreed to place the question of Quebec independence as intertwined with social or class issues. This was hotly debated as the party transformed into Québec solidaire. The debate moved over into the PCQ as well. These positions were questioned by the Quebec leader of the party, André Parizeau, who formulated a series of amendments in support of immediate independence in 2004 which were rejected by both the National Executive Committee (NEC) of the Quebec party (by a vote of 4–2) and by the Central Executive Committee of the Canadian party (by a vote of 7–1).

In January 2005, Parizeau wrote a letter to PCQ members declaring that the party was in crisis and, describing the four NEC members who opposed his amendments as a pro-federalist "Gang of Four", he summarily dismissed them. Although his Quebec nationalist point of view held a majority at the PCQ's convention of April 2005, who was granted voting rights was highly disputed. Parizeau was subsequently expelled by the Party. Around the same time, his group announced their withdrawal from the CPC.

However, after a dispute where both groups presented documentation, the official Directeur général des élections du Québec on 3 April 2006, recognized the Parti communiste du Québec led by André Parizeau. Parizeau later disavowed the PCQ in 2019 so he could be accepted as a candidate for the Bloc Québécois in the 2019 federal election.

The Central Committee of the party, however, affirmed the authority of the previous Quebec National Executive Committee in 18–19 June 2005. The non-registered CPC-aligned PCQ held a new convention which restarted a communist French-language periodical, Clarté, and later opened an office and small reading room, launched an active website, and re-affiliated with Quebec Solidaire as an organized group. They work closely with the youth and student organization, the "Ligue de la jeunesse communiste du Quebec".

After 2005 
The PCQ-PCC participated in the 2007 elections running three candidates under the banner of Quebec Solidaire, as well as offering its own independent perspective on the election.

The original PCQ-PCC again participated in the 2007 elections running three candidates under the banner of Quebec Solidaire, as well as offering its own independent perspective on the election.

The PCQ-PCC participated in the 2007 elections under the banner of Quebec Solidaire, focusing on the campaign of one candidate in Acadie (bumping out the leader of the nationalist PCQ). The PCQ-PCC also presented its own independent perspective on the election and the question of voting and the student struggle. The PCQ-PCC also presented candidates in the 2011 federal election.

The PCQ-PCC left QS following QS's merger with Option nationale in 2017.

The PCQ-PCC convened its most recent congress in spring 2018. The Party continues to publish the newspaper Clarté and now maintains an office on Parc Avenue.

Party leader Pierre Fontaine died of a heart attack on 27 May 2020. He was succeeded by Adrien Welsh, the former General Secretary of the Young Communist League of Canada.

General Secretaries 
 Sam Walsh (1965–1989)
 Marianne Roy (1989–1991)
 Ginette Gauthier (1991–1994)
 André Cloutier (1994–1998)
 André Parizeau (1998–2004)
 Pierre Fontaine (2004–2020)
 Adrien Welsh (since 2020)

See also 
 Communism in Quebec

Notes

References

External links 
 
 Regarding the other "PCQ" — statement by Parizeau on the split
 Nationalist attempt to control PCQ defeated — CPC statement on the split
 Directeur Général des Élections du Québec information page 
 National Assembly historical information

Communism in Quebec
Communist parties in Canada
Political parties established in 1921
Provincial political parties in Quebec
Organizations based in Montreal
1921 establishments in Quebec